Antônio Guimarães (4 May 1900 – 27 February 1975) was a Brazilian sports shooter. He competed at the 1932, 1936, 1948 and 1952 Summer Olympics.

References

1900 births
1975 deaths
Brazilian male sport shooters
Olympic shooters of Brazil
Shooters at the 1932 Summer Olympics
Shooters at the 1936 Summer Olympics
Shooters at the 1948 Summer Olympics
Shooters at the 1952 Summer Olympics
Sportspeople from Rio de Janeiro (city)
Pan American Games medalists in shooting
Pan American Games bronze medalists for Brazil
Shooters at the 1951 Pan American Games
20th-century Brazilian people